Amy Louise Acker (born December 5, 1976) is an American actress. She is best known for starring as Winifred Burkle and Illyria on the supernatural drama series Angel (2001–2004), as Kelly Peyton on the action drama series Alias (2005–2006), and as Root on the science-fiction drama series Person of Interest (2012–2016). From 2017 to 2019, she starred as Caitlin Strucker on the superhero drama series The Gifted, based on Marvel Comics' X-Men.

Early life
Amy Louise Acker was born on December 5, 1976 and raised in Dallas, Texas, to a homemaker mother and a lawyer father. She studied ballet and modern dance for 14 years. She underwent knee surgery while in high school, ending her ballet career. Acker graduated from Lake Highlands High School in Dallas. She subsequently earned a bachelor's degree in theater from Southern Methodist University.

In her junior year of college, Acker modeled for the J. Crew catalog. She received a Bachelor of Fine Arts degree in the same year. She worked as a stage actress for several seasons, including a stint at American Players Theatre in Spring Green, Wisconsin.

Career
Acker made her major television debut when she starred as Winifred "Fred" Burkle in Angel (seasons 2–5), and also as the character of Illyria for part of the show's fifth and final season. She won the 2003 Saturn Award for Best Supporting Actress on Television for her portrayal.

Acker joined the cast of Alias in 2005 for its final season, playing villainess Kelly Peyton. Acker graduated from guest star to cast member as the show entered the final episodes in April and May 2006. Also in 2005, Acker provided voice acting for the character of Huntress on the animated series Justice League Unlimited. She went on to make a guest appearance on How I Met Your Mother, in which she was reunited with Angel co-star Alexis Denisof (the real-life husband of HIMYM star Alyson Hannigan), who had a recurring role on the show.

Acker portrayed Dr. Claire Saunders/Whiskey, a recurring character, on Joss Whedon's Dollhouse. She guest-starred in 10 of the 13 episodes of the first season and three episodes of the second.

In 2010, Acker was a series regular in the ABC drama Happy Town, portraying the character Rachel Conroy. That same year, she starred in the season-one finale of the Fox series Human Target as the mysterious Katherine Walters. On May 25, 2010, she appeared on CBS's The Good Wife. She appeared in the horror movie The Cabin in the Woods, released April 13, 2012. In 2012, she made guest performances in Warehouse 13, Once Upon a Time, and Grimm. Also in 2012, she starred as Beatrice in Joss Whedon's film Much Ado About Nothing.

Acker appeared in season three of the sitcom Husbands as Claudia, Brad Kelt's ex-fiancée of who unexpectedly shows up. In March 2014, Acker was cast as Audrey, a former lover to Phil Coulson in an episode of Agents of S.H.I.E.L.D.

Between 2012 and 2016, Acker portrayed Samantha "Root" Groves on the CBS drama Person of Interest; Groves became a regular character starting in the series' third season. Starting with the series' 100th episode, Acker took on the voice role of the Machine. In the series finale, she also appeared as the visual manifestation of the Machine.

In March 2017, Acker was cast as Caitlin Strucker in the pilot for the prospective Fox television series The Gifted, which was picked up to series in May 2017. The Gifted began airing on October 2, 2017 and Fox canceled the series after two seasons on April 17, 2019.

In 2019, Acker appeared in What Just Happened??! with Fred Savage, a parody of aftershows. She plays Dr. Rachel Layne in the "show-within-a-show", a fictional drama series called The Flare.

Personal life

On April 25, 2003, Acker married actor James Carpinello in California. They have a son, born in 2005, and a daughter, born in 2006.

Filmography

Film

Television

Web

Awards and nominations

References

External links

 
 
 
 

1976 births
Living people
20th-century American actresses
21st-century American actresses
Actresses from Dallas
Female models from Texas
American film actresses
American television actresses
American voice actresses
Southern Methodist University alumni